Komba Tawa Yomba widely known as Keeper Towa (born August 24, 1976 in Koidu Town, Sierra Leone) is a Sierra Leonean international football goalkeeper. He is the captain of the Diamond Stars in the Sierra Leone National Premier League. He is rated as one of the best Sierra Leonean goalkeepers of all time. Yomba was the first-choice goalkeeper for Sierra Leone during qualification for the 2002 FIFA World Cup but he has since lost that position to Michael Tommy, who himself has lost the position to young goalkeeper Christian Caulker, who is currently the Leone Stars first-choice goalkeeper.

External links

1977 births
Living people
Association football goalkeepers
Sierra Leonean footballers
People from Kono District
Sierra Leone international footballers